Pleuromeris is a genus of molluscs in the family Carditidae.

Species
 Pleuromeris armilla (Dall, 1903)
 Pleuromeris benthicola Powell, 1937
 †Pleuromeris decemcostata Conrad, 1867
 †Pleuromeris koruahinensis (Bartrum & Powell, 1928) (synonym: Venericardia koruahinensis Bartrum & Powell, 1928)
 Pleuromeris latiuscula Powell, 1937
 Pleuromeris marshalli (Marwick, 1924)
 Pleuromeris micella Olsson & McGinty, 1958
 Pleuromeris paucicostata Laws, 1940
 Pleuromeris pygmaea (Kuroda & Habe, 1951)
 Pleuromeris sanmartini Klappenbach, 1970
 Pleuromeris tridentata (Say, 1826) – three-toothed cardita
 Pleuromeris ultima Dell, 1956
 Pleuromeris zelandica (Deshayes, 1854)

References

External links
 Bartrum & Powell (1928), Mollusca from Kaawa Creek; Transactions and Proceedings of the Royal Society of New Zealand 1868-1961

Carditidae
Bivalve genera